Tellurium fluoride may refer to any of these compounds:

Tellurium tetrafluoride, TeF4
Tellurium hexafluoride, TeF6
Ditellurium decafluoride, Te2F10